Habibabad ,  (previously, Wan Radha Ram) is a town part of Pattoki Tehsil in the Kasur District in the Province of Punjab, Pakistan. The population is about 150,000.

Location

History and environs 

The town was named Habibabad in Sardar Arif Nakai's period on the request of local politician and landlord Sanda family. Earlier, it was named Wan Radha Ram  the name of Chak Wasti. Habibabad's real name is Mozia Umerabad named on Mian Omerdin by his son Mian Abdurrahim Darogha who owned thousands acres lands in Sanda Kalan and Mozia Umerabad tehsil Pattoki. Mian Abdurrahim Darogha belonging from Noble Arain family of Sanda owned Mozia Umerabad (Habibabad). Sandha Family is still the landlord and important family of Habibabad and its surroundings. The Family Has Great Influence in Local Politics

Neighborhoods include Bypass, Shuja Market, Shergarh Bazar, Sanda Bazar, Ali Haider Sanda Market and Rail Bazar. Much of the town is seeing new construction, as in Faisal Town, Ashrafia Town, and the Lalapak housing scheme. The main areas of Habibabad are Nei Mandi, Purani Mandi, Lalazar Colony, Javed Nagar, Umer Abad, Malik Wali Hussain Sanda Town and Karmabad.

Politics and Press 
Mostly peoples of Habibabd knows very well about M Yaseen Alvi (Shah) (General Counselor) he participate in local Government Election and Won many times. A very hard working and Gentleman. Mr Yaseen Alvi (Shah) organized Free EYE Camps in Government Hospital on his own pocket. And Also some time other locals participate in this Social welfare Camps. A local Press Club working under local Person,s like Ch. Amjad (Owner Choudhry Marriage Hall) and Zohaib Razaq(President Bazar Committee) Also Mr Naeem Rasheed Columnist. MPA Peer Mukhtiar Ahmad Alam very well know Person by PTI Govt and also very Polite Person.(Source/Edited By Adnan Zafar Bhatti "Islamabad")

Economics 

Most of the population are employed in agriculture and shops. There is a trend increasing towards education, with many private schools. There are number of schools and colleges. Government Higher Secondary School for boys and Government Higher Secondary School for girls are prominent education institutes in the city which are situated in kot malik wali hussain, nei mandi. There are more than 6 industries, 6 petrol pumps, 6 compressed natural gas stations, government offices, and private banks. The business of herbal medicine a prominent part of life in the city. Now there are number of oil mills and ginning factories. There are many shops such as hardware, sweets, electronics, and general stores. Still most of economic structure of families is based on agriculture, especially in suburban areas.

Populated places in Kasur District